The discography of British singer-songwriter and former All Saints member Shaznay Lewis consists of one studio album, three singles and five music videos. In July 2004, Lewis released her debut solo album Open, which charted at number 22 in the UK. The album produced two singles: "Never Felt Like This Before" and "You".

Albums

Studio albums

Singles

As a featured artist

Music videos

References 

Discographies of British artists
All Saints (group)